Frederick Adam Leinweber (born March 17, 1915, date of death unknown) was an American handball player. He was a member of the United States men's national handball team. He was part of the  team at the 1936 Summer Olympics, playing 3 matches. At club level he played for the German Sport Club Brooklyn in the United States.

References

External links
 

1915 births
Year of death missing
Field handball players at the 1936 Summer Olympics
American male handball players
Olympic handball players of the United States
People from New York (state)